The Rufus Choate House is a historic house at 14 Lynde Street in Salem, Massachusetts. It is primarily recognized for its association with lawyer and Federalist Party politician Rufus Choate (1799-1859), who lived here from about 1825 to 1834.  It is a three-story Federal style wood-frame house that was built in 1805 by Ebenezer Beckford, a Salem merchant and real estate developer.  Beckford, and later his same-named son, owned the property until 1841.

The house was listed on the National Register of Historic Places in 1982.

See also
Downtown Salem District, whose western edge is a few buildings to the east
Chestnut Street District, which begins a block west at North Street
Federal Street District, just to the property's north
National Register of Historic Places listings in Salem, Massachusetts
National Register of Historic Places listings in Essex County, Massachusetts

References

Houses in Salem, Massachusetts
National Register of Historic Places in Essex County, Massachusetts
National Register of Historic Places in Salem, Massachusetts
Houses on the National Register of Historic Places in Essex County, Massachusetts